Juan Valdez is a fictional character who has appeared in advertisements for the National Federation of Coffee Growers of Colombia since 1958, representing a Colombian coffee farmer. The advertisements were designed by the Doyle Dane Bernbach ad agency, with the goal of distinguishing 100%-Colombian coffee from coffee blended with beans from other countries. He typically appears with his donkey Conchita, carrying sacks of harvested coffee beans.  He has become an icon for Colombia as well as coffee in general, and Juan Valdez's iconic appearance is frequently mimicked or parodied in television and other media.

The Juan Valdez character is used as an ingredient brand, to specifically denote coffee beans that are only grown and harvested in Colombia. Part of the advertising campaign includes convincing consumers that there are specific benefits of Colombian-grown and harvested coffee beans, "including how soil components, altitude, varieties and harvesting methods create good flavor." The National Federation of Coffee Growers of Colombia is entirely owned and controlled by Colombia's coffee farmers (cafeteros) which number over 500,000 people.

History
Juan Valdez was designed by the DDB advertising founder William Bernbach in 1958 to promote coffee in the US. Juan Valdez was initially portrayed by a Cuban actor, José F. Duval in both print advertisements and on television until 1969. José Duval died in 1993 at the age of 72.

Juan Valdez had been embodied by Carlos Sánchez since 1969 and voiced by Norman Rose. Sánchez played Valdez in a brief sequence in the 2003 comedy film Bruce Almighty. In 2006, Sánchez announced his retirement, and Carlos Castañeda, a grower from the town of Andes, Antioquia, was selected by the National Federation of Coffee Growers of Colombia as the new face of Juan Valdez.

Brand
There were 238 Juan Valdez coffee shops in 2013, 135 in Colombia and 35 shops in other countries.  Juan Valdez brand coffee is available in Paraguay, Chile, Costa Rica, Aruba, Ecuador, El Salvador, Panama, Spain, Kuwait, Germany and the United States at supermarkets and Juan Valdez coffee shops.

Controversies
The name "Juan Valdez" is by no means unique, as both Juan and Valdez are common Spanish-language names and there are possibly thousands of men with this name alive today (although the Valdez name is hardly known in the coffee growing regions of Colombia); this became relevant in a 2006 lawsuit over the phrase "Juan Valdez drinks Costa Rican coffee".

The National Federation of Coffee Growers of Colombia sued cartoonist Mike Peters, creator of Mother Goose & Grimm, for a cartoon talking about Juan Valdez and Colombian coffee in January 2009.  In a weeklong series making fun of various commercial products, he referenced violence in Colombia by having a character say: "Y'know, there's a big crime syndicate in Colombia. So when they say there's a little bit of Juan Valdez in every can, maybe they're not kidding."  The lawsuit was dropped after Mr. Peters apologized publicly.

Gallery

See also

 Arriero
 Colombian coffee
 Juan Valdez Cafe
 Kaldi, the legendary Ethiopian equivalent

References

External links

 Página oficial de Juan Valdez
 Juan's Impact on Fresh Roasted Coffee
 Federación Nacional de Cafeteros de Colombia
 Café de Colombia
 Juan Valdez Café  Bogotá, Colombia

Drink advertising characters
Male characters in advertising
Colombian culture
Coffee brands
National personifications
Economic history of Colombia
Colombian brands
Fictional Colombian people
Fictional farmers
Mascots introduced in 1958
Fictional characters introduced in 1958